MaggieMoo's Ice Cream and Treatery is a chain of independently owned and operated franchised stores that specialize in serving  ice cream and other desserts. The first MaggieMoo's opened in 1989 in Kansas City, Kansas. At its peak, the brand had 400 stores and had a goal of opening over 1,000 stores. The brand's headquarters are in unincorporated Fulton County, Georgia. When MaggieMoo's was an independent company, it had its headquarters in Columbia, Maryland. It was a franchise brand in the portfolio of Global Franchise Group, along with Marble Slab Creamery, until 2021 after Global Franchise Group was acquired by FAT Brands.

History
MaggieMoo's was founded in Kansas City, Kansas by Juel and Katherine Tillery. After deciding to open an ice cream store they were searching for a name. They named their store after a cow on a farm that they passed by every day whom their young daughter affectionally named "MaggieMoo". The Tillerys enjoyed great success in their initial store and began to launch a franchise program. By 1996 there were approximately 90 units open, mostly in Kansas City, but also in St. Louis, Wichita, Topeka, Des Moines, and Lincoln.

The Tillerys sold the company to a group of investors led by Richard J. Sharoff who became the CEO. Sharoff was a veteran of the food and franchise industry having previously been a 30 store franchisee of Boston Market and president of Vie de France. Sharoff moved the headquarters to Columbia, Maryland, proceeded to open two new company units in nearby Northern Virginia, and built a team of franchisee professionals. The company chose Kansas City cartoonist Charlie Podrebarac to create the MaggieMoo character, logo, and the "Tail of MaggieMoo", the story about "SpokesMaggie". The franchise program continued to grow and the chain celebrated its 100th unit opening in Phoenix, Arizona in 2003.

Sharoff left the company in 2003 and was succeeded by John Jamison. In February 2007 the company was sold to NexCen Brands, Inc. for a reported $16 million. Global Franchise Group acquired NexCen in July 2010.

On June 28, 2021, Global Franchise Group announced that it would be acquired by FAT Brands, owners of Fatburger and Johnny Rockets. The acquisition was completed on July 22. After the acquisition, MaggieMoo's scaled down its operations and most locations have been converted to Marble Slab Creamery locations.

Charity work
The company does various charity works, under the name of their mascot, Miss Maggie Moo.

According to the company, their activities, all fronted by their mascot, include "rescuing animals with the Humane Society, raising money for the Hurricane Katrina Victims, walking in support of a cure for breast cancer, assisting schools to raise money, or helping Girl Scouts and Boy Scouts earn their badges."

References

External links

MaggieMoo's

Companies based in Fulton County, Georgia
Restaurants established in 1989
Fast-food franchises
Fast-food chains of the United States
Ice cream parlors in the United States
1989 establishments in Kansas
2007 mergers and acquisitions